Eutretosoma oculata is a species of tephritid or fruit flies in the genus Eutretosoma of the family Tephritidae.

Distribution
Mozambique.

References

Tephritinae
Insects described in 1914
Diptera of Africa